Selinountas (older form Selinous) is a village in the municipal unit of Aigio, Achaea, Greece. It is located on the right bank of the river Selinountas, about 4 km southeast of Aigio. The Greek National Road 8A (Patras - Aigio - Corinth) passes the village in the north.  Selinountas had a population of 449 in 2011.

Population

External links
 Paraskevi GTP Travel Pages

See also

List of settlements in Achaea

References

Aigialeia
Aigio
Populated places in Achaea